Sebold is a surname that can refer to:

Alice Sebold (born 1963), American writer
William G. Sebold (1899–1970), World War II double agent against Germany in the U.S.

See also
 Seabold
 Sebald (disambiguation)
 Seibold
 Siebold

Surnames from given names